is a Japanese light novel series, written by Shōgo Kinugasa and illustrated by Shunsaku Tomose published from May 2015 to September 2019 under Media Factory's MF Bunko J imprint. A sequel light novel series called "Classroom of the Elite: Year 2" began publishing in January 2020. A manga adaptation by Yuyu Ichino began its serialization in Media Factory's Monthly Comic Alive on January 27, 2016. A manga adaptation of the sequel light novel series illustrated by Shia Sasane began serialization in the same magazine on December 25, 2021. An anime television series adaptation produced by Lerche aired with the first season in 2017. A second season aired from July to September 2022, and a third season will premiere in 2023.

Plot

The Japanese government has established the Tokyo Metropolitan Advanced Nurturing School, dedicated to instruct and foster the generation of people that will support the country in the future. The students are given a high degree of freedom in order to closely mimic real life.

The story follows the perspective of Kiyotaka Ayanokōji, a quiet and unassuming boy, who is not good at making friends and would rather keep his distance, but possesses unrivaled intelligence. He is a student of Class-D, which is where the school dumps its inferior students. After meeting Suzune Horikita and Kikyō Kushida, two other students in his class, the situation begins to change and he starts to get involved in many affairs, and his thought of an ideal normal high school life begins to get scattered.

Media

Light novels

Classroom of the Elite
The series is written by Shōgo Kinugasa with illustrations by Shunsaku Tomose with total eleven volumes and three short volumes have been published from May 25, 2015, to September 25, 2019, under Media Factory's MF Bunko J imprint. Seven Seas Entertainment has licensed the series. On February 17, 2021, Seven Seas announced it released a new version of volume seven due to the localization decisions in the original omitting several paragraphs.

Classroom of the Elite: Year 2
A sequel light novel series called Classroom of the Elite: Year 2 is written by Shōgo Kinugasa with illustrations by Shunsaku Tomose and has been published under Media Factory's MF Bunko J imprint since January 2020. As of February 2023, nine volumes and one short volume has been released. Seven Seas Entertainment has also licensed Year 2.

Manga

Classroom of the Elite
A manga adaptation illustrated by Yuyu Ichino began serialization in Media Factory's Monthly Comic Alive magazine on January 27, 2016. It has been collected in twelve tankōbon volumes as of February 22, 2022. Seven Seas Entertainment has also licensed the manga and the first volume was released in February 2022.

Classroom of the Elite: Horikita
A spin-off manga illustrated by Sakagaki and centered around the character Suzune Horikita was serialized in Monthly Comic Alive from June 2017 to May 2018. Its chapters were collected in two tankōbon volumes. At Anime Expo 2022, Seven Seas Entertainment announced that they licensed the spin-off for English publication.

Classroom of the Elite: Year 2
A manga adaptation of the sequel light novel series illustrated by Shia Sasane began serialization in the Media Factory's Monthly Comic Alive magazine on December 25, 2021. It has been collected in one tankōbon volumes as of June 2022.

Anime

An anime television series adaptation was announced and aired from July 12 to September 27, 2017, on AT-X and other channels. Seiji Kishi and Hiroyuki Hashimoto directed the anime at Lerche. Aoi Akashiro handled the series composition, Kazuaki Morita designed the characters, and Ryo Takahashi composed the music. The opening theme "Caste Room" is performed by ZAQ, and the ending theme "Beautiful Soldier" is performed by Minami. Crunchyroll streamed the series with subtitles and Funimation streamed the English dub. iQIYI added the series onto its platform in 2022, Q3, and Thai dub of the series is available as well.   

On February 21, 2022, it was announced that a sequel was in production. The series was later revealed to be two additional seasons, with Lerche returning as the studio. The second season is directed by Yoshihito Nishōji, with Kishi and Hashimoto returning as chief directors, Hayato Kazano replacing Akashiro as the scriptwriter, and Morita returning as the character designer. Masaru Yokoyama and Kana Hashiguchi are composing the music, replacing Takahashi. The second season aired from July 4 to September 26, 2022. The opening theme "Dance in the Game" is performed by ZAQ, and the ending theme "Hito Jibai" is performed by Mai Fuchigami. The third season will premiere in 2023.

Notes

References

External links
Light novel official website 
Light novel Year 2 official website 
Anime official website 

2015 Japanese novels
2017 anime television series debuts
2020 Japanese novels
Anime and manga based on light novels
Crunchyroll anime
Fiction with unreliable narrators
Funimation
Kadokawa Dwango franchises
Lerche (studio)
Light novels
Media Factory manga
MF Bunko J
Muse Communication
Psychological thriller anime and manga
School life in anime and manga
Seinen manga
Seven Seas Entertainment titles
Upcoming anime television series